Hijos de Yurimaguas is a Perúvian football club, playing in the city of Callao, Lima.

History
The club was the 1990 and 1998 Segunda División Peruana champion.

The club have played at the highest level of Peruvian football on two occasions, from 1991 Torneo Descentralizado until 1992 Torneo Descentralizado when was relegated.

Honours

National
Peruvian Segunda División: 2
Winners (2): 1990, 1998
Runner-up (2): 1994, 1996

Liga Distrital de Ventanilla: 0
Runner-up (1): 2009

See also
List of football clubs in Peru
Peruvian football league system

Football clubs in Peru
Association football clubs established in 1967